Generation Joshua (often called "GenJ" by its members) is an American Christian youth organization founded in 2003 that aims to encourage youth participation in government, history, civics, and politics for conservative Christian values. Generation Joshua is a division of the Home School Legal Defense Association (HSLDA), which is a non-profit 501(c)3 organization, based in Purcellville, Virginia.

Generation Joshua seeks to educate students on the history and founding of the United States through a conservative Christian perspective, while also providing hands-on opportunities for students to be involved in government and politics. To this end, the organization provides civics education classes, a book club program, and bi-weekly current events discussions. Generation Joshua also seeks to promote activism opportunities for members through local clubs, voter registration drives, and Student Action Teams, where student members campaign for political candidates. The organization also offers a college scholarship program, called the Ben Rush Awards Program, where students participate in civic involvement to earn money for college.

Generation Joshua campaigns solely for conservative, mostly Republican candidates who support anti-abortion and otherwise socially conservative platforms. 

All partisan activities are operated and funded by the HSLDA PAC.

Generation Joshua's name is taken from the Biblical figure Joshua, who led the nation of Israel after Moses.

Programs
Generation Joshua runs five major programs: the Civics Education program, local Generation Joshua clubs, Student Action Teams, the Voter Registration Initiative, and the Benjamin Rush Awards Program. In addition to these, it offers four political simulation camps (called "iGovern" camps) during the summer. Generation Joshua has over 65 local clubs (as of 2008). At GenJ Club meetings, usually once a month, at least 10 times per year, members discuss current events with a Biblical perspective, listen to a special speaker, pray for the nation and its leaders, and organize local activism. The clubs are governed by Robert's Rules of Order and are led by a president and other officers. The clubs include homeschoolers as well as private and public school students.

Generation Joshua's "Student Action Teams" buses students from across the country to campaign in local, state, federal elections for conservative candidates. These students, often too young to vote, are encouraged to go door to door and campaign for candidates who share their values. Generation Joshua students have influenced the outcomes of congressional elections in November 2016.

Relation To HSLDA
GenJ's national offices are at the Home School Legal Defense Association, which is also the campus of Patrick Henry College.  Michael Smith, president of the group's parent organization, the Homeschool Legal Defense Association sees Generation Joshua as part of a larger movement. By training students (often homeschoolers) in the principles of conservative Christian political views and encouraging them to be active politically, Generation Joshua seeks to fundamentally influence the next generation's involvement in government. Many of these students go on to enter conservative colleges such as Patrick Henry College, (also founded by the HSLDA) where they will learn to "restore a moral framework and return America to its founding principles".

See also

Patrick Henry College
Home School Legal Defense Association
National Christian Forensics and Communications Association

References

External links
 

Political organizations based in the United States
Youth organizations based in Virginia
Christian organizations based in the United States
Conservative organizations in the United States